Carapa procera, called African crabwood, is a species of tree in the genus Carapa, native to the West African tropics and to the Amazon rainforest, and introduced to Vietnam. Some authorities have split off the South American population into its own species, Carapa surinamensis. The nuts are intensively collected in the wild for their oil, a non-timber forest product. In tropical Africa, the species is increasingly threatened.

References

procera
Non-timber forest products
Plants described in 1824